Ankyrin 1, also known as ANK-1, and erythrocyte ankyrin, is a protein that in humans is encoded by the ANK1 gene.

Tissue distribution
The protein encoded by this gene, Ankyrin 1, is the prototype of the ankyrin family, was first discovered in erythrocytes, but since has also been found in brain and muscles.

Genetics
Complex patterns of alternative splicing in the regulatory domain, giving rise to different isoforms of ankyrin 1 have been described, however, the precise functions of the various isoforms are not known.  Alternative polyadenylation accounting for the different sized erythrocytic ankyrin 1 mRNAs, has also been reported.  Truncated muscle-specific isoforms of ankyrin 1 resulting from usage of an alternate promoter have also been identified.

Disease linkage
Mutations in erythrocytic ankyrin 1 have been associated in approximately half of all patients with hereditary spherocytosis.

ANK1 shows altered methylation and expression in Alzheimer's disease. A gene expression study of postmortem brains has suggested ANK1 interacts with interferon-γ signalling.

Function
The ANK1 protein belongs to the ankyrin family that are believed to link the integral membrane proteins to the underlying spectrin-actin cytoskeleton and play key roles in activities such as cell motility, activation, proliferation, contact, and maintenance of specialized membrane domains.  Multiple isoforms of ankyrin with different affinities for various target proteins are expressed in a tissue-specific, developmentally regulated manner.  Most ankyrins are typically composed of three structural domains: an amino-terminal domain containing multiple ankyrin repeats; a central region with a highly conserved spectrin-binding domain; and a carboxy-terminal regulatory domain, which is the least conserved and subject to variation.

The small ANK1 (sAnk1) protein splice variants makes contacts with obscurin, a giant protein surrounding the contractile apparatus in striated muscle.

Interactions
ANK1 has been shown to interact with T-cell lymphoma invasion and metastasis-inducing protein 1, Titin, RHAG and OBSCN.

See also
 Ankyrin

References

Further reading

External links
 
 

Proteins